Farme de Amoedo Street (Rua Farme de Amoedo in Portuguese, local Brazilian ) is an important LGBT street in the city of Rio de Janeiro, Brazil, that starts at the Vieira Souto Avenue and ends at Alberto de Campos Street. 

Another very famous gathering area within the Ipanema district is the Farme de Amoedo gay area block. The region is located between Teixeira de Mello and Joana Angélica Streets, and is also perpendicular do Barão da Torre, Visconde de Pirajá, Prudente de Morais Streets & Vieira Souto Avenue. The Farme de Amoedo block is known to be Rio's greatest concentration of gays. The area gets hot after 9:00 PM, when people mingle at the Farme de Amoedo surroundings gay friendly bars and gourmet restaurants. Farme de Amoedo's main hub would be the corner of Farme and Visconde de Pirajá streets. 

According to the Brazil Gay Guide, there are at least 5 specific gay bars and nightclubs close to the Farme de Amoedo block, including: A Casa da Lua, at Barão da Torre Street, 240; Bofetada Bar at Farme de Amoedo Street, 87; Galeria Café at Teixeira de Mello Street, 31; Dama de Ferro nightclub at Vinícius de Moraes Street, 288, and finally Lounge, 69, (specialized in electronic music), also at Farme de Amoedo Street. Some other restaurants and bars at the region although not specific, are generally very receptive and gay-friendly, especially with foreigners. During carnival, this Ipanema region is completely packed with tourists from all over the world. According to the LGBT app Grindr, the gay beach part of Ipanema was elected the best of the world for LGBTs.

See also

 Gay village
 LGBT rights in Brazil
 LGBT rights in the World

References

Streets in Rio de Janeiro (city)
Gay villages in Brazil
Restaurant districts and streets in Brazil